The Penrith Panthers are an Australian professional rugby league team based in the western Sydney suburb of Penrith, New South Wales. The club was founded in 1966, and joined the New South Wales Rugby League in 1967.

The following is a list of rugby league footballers who have appeared for Penrith Panthers since the club's first league game in 1967. As foundation captain of the club Tony Brown was afforded the No.1 position on the list.

Players
Correct as of round 3 of the 2023 NRL season

Sources

References

Players

National Rugby League lists
Lists of Australian rugby league players
Sydney-sport-related lists